Reeds (referred to as "Reeds Crossroads" on many maps) is an unincorporated community in Tyro township, Davidson County, North Carolina. It is located at the intersection of Old US Highway 64 and NC Highway 150. Neighboring communities and municipalities include Churchland, Tyro, Arcadia, Yadkin College, and Lexington.

Schools
Reeds Elementary

References

Unincorporated communities in Davidson County, North Carolina
Unincorporated communities in North Carolina